Punky may refer to:
Punky can be used as a nickname for Penelope (given name)
 Punky (TV series), an Irish animated television series
 Punky Brewster, an American sitcom television series
 Punky Brüster – Cooked on Phonics, the debut studio album by Canadian musician Devin Townsend
 Punky Skunk, a 1996 side-scrolling action-platform video game
 Punky Meadows (born 1950), American guitarist and member of the band Angel
 Punky, a colloquial name for the biting midges family Ceratopogonidae

See also
Punky's, a type of candy
Punkie (disambiguation)